Llantrisant Fawr is a community in Monmouthshire, Wales. Villages within the community include Llantrisant and Llanllowell. The population in the 2011 census was 475.

References

External links

Communities in Monmouthshire